Aroor State assembly constituency is one of the 140 state legislative assembly constituencies in Kerala state in southern India. It is also one of the 7 state legislative assembly constituencies included in the Alappuzha Lok Sabha constituency. As of the 2021 assembly elections, the current MLA is Daleema Jojo of CPI(M).

Local self governed segments
Aroor Niyamasabha constituency is composed of the following local self governed segments:

Members of Legislative Assembly
The following list contains all members of Kerala legislative assembly who have represented Aroor Niyamasabha Constituency during the period of various assemblies:

Key

Election results
Percentage change (±%) denotes the change in the number of votes from the immediate previous election.

Niyamasabha by-election 2019
Due to the election of the sitting MLA, A. M. Ariff as the MP from Alappuzha (Lok Sabha constituency), Aroor Niyamasabha Constituency went to bypolls in 2019. There were 1,91,898 registered voters in Aroor Constituency for this election.

Niyama Sabha Election 2016
There were 1,88,615 registered voters in Aroor Constituency for the 2016 Kerala Niyama Sabha Election.

Niyamasabha Election 2011 
There were 1,74,130 registered voters in the constituency for the 2011 election.

See also
 Aroor
 Alappuzha district
 List of constituencies of the Kerala Legislative Assembly
 2016 Kerala Legislative Assembly election
 2019 Kerala Legislative Assembly by-elections

References 

Assembly constituencies of Kerala

State assembly constituencies in Alappuzha district